Matthew Davis was an Irish Fianna Fáil politician. He was elected to Dáil Éireann as a Fianna Fáil Teachta Dála (TD) for the Athlone–Longford constituency at the 1937 general election. He lost his seat at the 1938 general election. He stood unsuccessfully as a Clann na Talmhan candidate at the 1948 general election for the Roscommon constituency.

References

Year of birth missing
Year of death missing
Fianna Fáil TDs
Members of the 9th Dáil